Jimeno (Ximeno) I was the 9th century father of García Jiménez of Pamplona. In spite of various biographical details having been created, there are no unambiguous records of his existence except in the patronymics of his sons, García and Íñigo Jiménez, indicating a father named Jimeno. In 850, the French court received envoys from Induo and Mitio, "dukes of the Navarrese", and it has been supposed that these names represent those of Íñigo Arista and Jimeno, but Sánchez Albornoz argued against the latter identification. Likewise it has been suggested that, like his son, he may have been ruler of "another part of the kingdom" of Pamplona, or even that he was regent of the entire kingdom (for which there is no evidence).  The location of his hypothetical principality has been placed around Álava, where a count Vela Jiménez, traditionally thought to have been his son (again based on patronymic), held sway.

He has sometimes been described as Jimeno the Strong, but this results from confusion with a much earlier man of that name. Likewise, he sometimes appears as Jimeno Garcés due to hypotheses about his origins. The belief that he was kinsman of Íñigo I Arista has led to various reconstructed pedigrees, filling the gaps with otherwise unknown or chronologically misplaced individuals, the most common version making him son of a García Jiménez, and thereby making "Garcés" the patronymic of Jimeno.

If he ruled, he was apparently succeeded in his principality by son García Jiménez. He is noteworthy as the earliest documented ancestor of a royal house—the Jiménez—that displaced the line of Arista in 905 and reigned in Navarre until 1234.

No record of his wife remains, although historian Justo Pérez de Urbel has suggested that he was the unnamed prince of Pamplona who married Leodegundia Ordoñez, daughter of King Ordoño I of Asturias. Sánchez Albornoz harbors no doubts that Leodegundia married a king of Pamplona, as mentioned in the "Códice de Roda" when she is called Domna Leodegundia Regina, nevertheless, he believes that she would have married a reigning king, not Jimeno of Pamplona, who would also have been much too old for her and that, in any case, the most likely candidate would have been either García Íñiguez or his son Fortún Garcés.

Jimeno had at least two children, both documented:

García Jiménez, who apparently succeeded him
Íñigo Jiménez, named as brother of García Jiménez in the Códice de Roda.

It has also been suggested that he was the father of two other children, although both hypotheses have been contested:

Vela Jiménez, founder of the Vela clan, the connection is not directly attested, but has been speculated based primarily on his patronymic, geography and chronology.
Oneca, wife of count Diogo Fernandes, the parents of several children including a Jimeno and Leodegundia and Countess Mumadona Dias. This identification is linked to Pérez de Urbel's hypothesis that Leodegundia Ordoñez was Jimeno's wife but others assign Oneca other parentage and suggest that Leodegundia could have married King García Íñiguez of Pamplona.

Notes

References

Sources

 
 
 
 
 
 
 

9th-century Navarrese monarchs
House of Jiménez
Navarrese monarchs
9th-century rulers in Europe